Kingford Smith Drive may refer to:
 Kingsford Smith Drive, Brisbane
 Kingsford Smith Drive, Canberra